Frederick Baily Dent (August 17, 1922 – December 10, 2019) was an American businessman who served as the United States Secretary of Commerce from February 2, 1973, to March 26, 1975, during the administrations of U.S. Presidents Richard M. Nixon and Gerald Ford

Early life and education
Dent was born on August 17, 1922, in Cape May, New Jersey, to Edith (née Baily) and Magruder Dent. He was raised in Greenwich, Connecticut, and attended St. Paul's School followed by Yale University, where he lettered in football. Dent was an officer in the Navy's ROTC program at Yale.

Career 
Dent served in the United States Navy from 1943 until 1946. In the Navy, Dent was the Lieutenant Junior Grade, where he captained the sub chaser USS PC 1547 and the patrol craft USS PCE(C) 873. He saw action in the Pacific where his patrol craft ferried troops to beachheads, including Okinawa, Japan, in the final stages of World War II. From 1958 until 1972 and 1977 until 1988, Dent was the president of Mayfair Mills in Arcadia, South Carolina.

He was appointed secretary of commerce by President Richard Nixon, serving from February 2, 1973, to March 26, 1975, and was President Gerald Ford's Trade Representative, from March 26, 1975, to January 20, 1977. Dent served as the United States trade representative from March 26, 1975, until January 20, 1977, during the remainder of President Ford's administration.

He was inducted into the South Carolina Business Hall of Fame in 1994.

Personal life
On March 11, 1944, Dent married Mildred "Millie" Carrington Harrison. They had five children. He resided in Spartanburg, South Carolina.

Dent died on December 10, 2019, at the age of 97. He was the last surviving secretary of commerce during the Nixon and Ford administrations.

References

External links

|-

1922 births
2019 deaths
20th-century American politicians
United States Navy personnel of World War II
Ford administration cabinet members
Military personnel from New Jersey
Nixon administration cabinet members
People from Cape May, New Jersey
Politicians from Spartanburg, South Carolina
People from Washington, D.C.
South Carolina Republicans
United States Navy officers
United States Secretaries of Commerce
United States Trade Representatives